Broglio may refer to:

People 
 Angelo Broglio da Lavello, known as Angelo Tartaglia (1350 or 1370–1421), Italian condottiere
 Chris de Broglio (1930–2014), Mauritian-born South African weightlifter and anti-Apartheid activist
 Ernie Broglio (1935–2019), American baseball player
 Luigi Broglio (1911–2001), Italian aerospace engineer
 Timothy Broglio (b. 1951), American prelate of the Roman Catholic Church

Places 
 Broglio, a village in Ticino, Switzerland
 Broglio Space Centre, Italian-owned spaceport near Malindi, Kenya

Other 
 Asteroid 18542 Broglio

See also 
 Castello di Brolio